The Atlantic campaign might refer to:

The Atlantic campaign of May 1794 fought between Britain and France as part of the French Revolutionary Wars
The Atlantic campaign of 1806 fought between Britain and France as part of the Napoleonic Wars
The Atlantic U-boat campaign of World War I
The Battle of the Atlantic in the Second World War